The Binnenhof is a complex of buildings in the city centre of The Hague, Netherlands, next to the Hofvijver lake. It houses the meeting place of both houses of the States General of the Netherlands, as well as the Ministry of General Affairs and the office of the Prime Minister of the Netherlands. Built primarily in the 13th century, the Gothic castle originally functioned as residence of the counts of Holland and became the political centre of the Dutch Republic in 1584. It is counted among the Top 100 Dutch heritage sites. The Binnenhof is among the oldest Parliament buildings in the world still in use.

History 

Little is known about the origin of the Binnenhof. Presumably, the grounds next to the Hofvijver lake, and the small homestead on it, were purchased by Count Floris IV of Holland from Meiland van Wassenaar in November 1229. Between 1230 and 1234 he had the homestead expanded to a small keep. After Floris' son and successor William II was crowned King of the Romans in 1248, this construction continued. Between 1248 and 1280, William had the Ridderzaal built. To its left and right, walls were built, which divided the area in front of the building from that behind it. Both walls had a gate. At the end of the wall on the left, near the Hofvijver, the court chapel was built, and near that the Ridderhuis (literally Knights' House) where visiting knights were sheltered. William died in battle in 1256, before the construction of the Ridderzaal had finished, and the castle was completed during the reign of his son, Floris V.

The Binnenhof was the residence of the counts of Holland for a short period. After the house of Holland died out in 1299, the county fell into the hands of the counts of Hainaut. The counts of Hainaut barely resided in the Binnenhof in the early 14th century. Duke Albert I of Bavaria and his successor William II lived in the Binnenhof virtually permanently. Under their reign, the castle saw a sizeable expansion, and gradually became enclosed by buildings.

When Holland had become part of the Burgundian Empire in 1432, the Binnenhof lost its purpose and was abandoned. Part of the complex was later made into the residence of the stadtholder of Holland, who governed the county in absence of its ruler. After Philip II was deposed as Count of Holland and the Dutch Republic was proclaimed in 1581, the Ridderzaal was initially a public space, often used by traders, stallholders and book sellers. In 1584, stadtholder Maurice moved into the stadtholder's quarter, and in the same year, the Ridderzaal became the meeting place of the newly formed States General of the Dutch Republic. The expansions of the Binnenhof by Maurice were the beginning of a gradually advancing reconstruction of the castle that ended after the construction of the southern wing under stadtholder William V, in the late 18th century.

Between 1806 and 1810, under French rule, the administrative centre of the Netherlands was moved to Amsterdam, and the Binnenhof became useless and it was considered for demolition. When the Netherlands gained independence from France, however, the government moved back to the Binnenhof. The existence of the building was in danger a second time in 1848, when a new constitution instituted a system of parliamentary democracy and the States General wished to symbolically demolish the old government buildings and build a new complex. The local residents, however, cared more for the historic value of the building, and successfully protested against demolition.

The House of Representatives sat in the Oude Zaal (literally Old Hall) until 1992, when it had become too small to facilitate the 150 members of the house, and a modern expansion was built on the south of the building, housing its new seat.

Layout 
Originally built as a ballroom, the Gothic Ridderzaal (a great hall, literally Knight's Hall) today forms the centre of the Binnenhof. Every third Tuesday of September, on Prinsjesdag, this is where the King holds his annual Speech from the Throne. Other buildings shape a rectangle around the Ridderzaal, creating a large courtyard in front of the building, and a smaller square behind it. A gilt Neo-Gothic fountain adorns the courtyard and a statue of King William II, one of few Dutch equestrian statues, guards its gate, the Stadtholder's Gate, which dates from 1620.

Looking out over the Hofvijver, the Senate sits in a chamber in the western corner of the Binnenhof, while the House of Representatives originally sat in the southern corner, at the other side of the Stadtholder's Gate. Today, the lower house meets in a chamber in the large modern eastern part of the complex. The Prime Minister's office has since 1982 been located in the small tower in the northern corner, simply called the Torentje (English: "Little Tower"). Located in the north-western wing, the Trêveszaal is a meeting room originally built for negotiations during the Eighty Years' War; today, it is the meeting room of the Cabinet.

Renovation 
Starting in the fall of 2021 (after Prinsjesdag), the Binnenhof will undergo a full renovation.

In 2014, a specially assigned task force, Renovatie Binnenhof, suggested a large renovation for the Binnenhof. Before that, only small maintenance had been done to the complex. Mostly the older buildings, next to the Hofvijver, are in need of renovation, such as Het Torentje (office of the Prime Minister of the Netherlands), de Trêveszaal (where the cabinet of the Netherlands holds its weekly meetings) and several other buildings. The renovation will mostly focus around air conditioning and central heating installations, IT systems, elevators, fire safety and modernisation of the kitchens.

In December 2015 a majority of the Dutch Parliament elected a plan for a full renovation of the complex, which will take approximately 5.5 years and is estimated to cost around €475 million. The first plan was to start the renovations in 2018, however this was postponed several times. The Senate will be moved during the renovation to the former building of the Ministry of Foreign Affairs, which has been prepared by a €40 million remodeling. The Prime Minister of the Netherlands and the Ministry of General Affairs will be moved to the Catshuis, where a temporary office building will house several hundred officials. The senate will be moved to Huis Huguetan, the former Supreme Court of the Netherlands building. The house of representatives will be moved to the former building of the secretary of state.

In 2017, the architectural firm Office for Metropolitan Architecture (OMA) received the assignment for designing and preparing the renovation. In early 2019 information was leaked that the projected cost for several 'activities' such as painting, carpets and security was off by around €60 million. Also, in 2019, the contract with OMA was discontinued. Another architectural firm, DOK, under the lead of architect Pi de Bruijn, who also designed the new construction for the Senate, was assigned to finish the plans. In the summer of 2021, politicians and officials will be moved to their temporary workplaces and after Prinsjesdag, which is on 21 September 2021, construction will begin in and around the Binnenhof.

References

External links 

 Official site 

Buildings and structures in The Hague
Legislative buildings in Europe
Seats of national legislatures
Squares in The Hague
States General of the Netherlands
Tourist attractions in South Holland
Palaces in the Netherlands